This list is of Major Sites Protected for their Historical and Cultural Value at the National Level in Liaoning Province, China.

 

|}

See also
 Principles for the Conservation of Heritage Sites in China

References

Liaoning